The density ratio of a column of seawater is a measure of the relative contributions of temperature and salinity in determining the density gradient. At a density ratio of 1, temperature and salinity are said to be compensated: their density signatures cancel, leaving a density gradient of zero.  The formula for the density ratio, R, is:

R = αθz/βSz, where

 θ is the potential temperature
 S is the salinity
 z is the vertical coordinate (with subscript denoting differentiation by z)
 ρ is the density
 α = −ρ−1∂ρ/∂θ is the thermal expansion coefficient 
 β = ρ−1∂ρ/∂S is the haline contraction coefficient

When a water column is "doubly stable"—both temperature and salinity contribute to the stable density gradient—the density ratio is negative (a doubly unstable water column would also have a negative density ratio but does not commonly occur).  A statically stable water column with a density ratio between 0 and 1 (cool fresh overlying warm salty) can support diffusive convection, and a statically stable water column with a density ratio larger than 1 can support salt fingering.

Density ratio may also be used to describe thermohaline variability over a non-vertical spatial interval, such as across a front in the mixed layer.

If the signs of both the numerator and denominator are reversed, the density ratio remains unchanged. A related quantity which avoids this ambiguity as well as the infinite values possible when the denominator vanishes is the Turner angle, Tu.

See also
 Spice (oceanography)

References

Physical oceanography